Georges de Porto-Riche (20 May 1849, Bordeaux, Gironde – 5 September 1930, Paris) was a French dramatist and novelist.

Biography
Georges was born into a Jewish-Italian assimilated family.

At the age of twenty, his pieces in verse began to be produced at the Parisian theatres; he also wrote some books of verse which met with a favorable reception, but these early works were not reprinted. In Germaine, the passionate and exacting heroine of Amoureuse, Mme Réjane found one of her best parts.

In 1898 he published Théâtre d'amour, which contained four of his most celebrated pieces: La Chance de Françoise, L'Infidèle, Amoureuse, and Le Passé. The title given to this collection indicates the difference between the plays of Porto-Riche, which focus on human emotion and psychological drama, and the political or sociological pieces of many of his contemporaries.  Even in Les Malefilâtres (Odéon, 1904), whose characters are drawn from the working class, love remains the central focus.

He was elected to the 6th seat of the Académie française in 1923. However, he was never officially received to the Académie, because the reading committee found the eulogy he wrote for his predecessor unsatisfactory, and he refused to rewrite it. Porto-Riche was also named a Grand officier in the Légion d'honneur.

He died in 1930 and was buried in the churchyard of Saint Valery in Varengeville-sur-Mer, Normandy.

Works 

1872: Primo Verba, poems
1873: Le Vertige, comedy in 1 act and in verse, Paris, Odéon, 27 June
1874: Pommes d'Ève (1874)
1875: Un drame sous Philippe II, drama in four acts and in verse, Paris, Odéon, 14 April
1877: Tout n'est pas rose, poems (1877)
1878: Les Deux Fautes, one-act comedy, Odéon, 18 December
1878: Vanina, fantaisie vénitienne in 2 parts and in verse
1888: La Chance de Françoise, one-act comedy, in prose
1889: Bonheur manqué, carnet d'un amoureux
1890: L'Infidèle, comedy in 1 act and in verse, music by Francis Thomé, Paris, Théâtre d'Application, 19 April
1891: Amoureuse, three-act comedy, Odéon, 25 April 
1897: Le Passé, five-act comedy,Odéon, 30 December ; reduced to 4 acts at the revival at the Théâtre-Français in 1902.
1904: Les Malefilâtre, two-act comedy, Théâtre de la Renaissance, 28 April
1911: Le Vieil homme, five-act play, Paris, Renaissance, 12 January
1912: Zubiri, fantasy in 1 act drawn from a story by Victor Hugo in Choses vues, Paris, Comédie royale, 1 February
1915: Quelques vers d'autrefois
1918: Le Marchand d'estampes, three-act drama
1920: Anatomie sentimentale, pages préférées
1923: Veux-tu que je sois ta femme ?, short story
1927: Sous mes yeux 
1929: Les Vrais Dieux, fantaisie antique in 2 parts, Paris, Théâtre Albert Ier, 22 November

Bibliography 
 Henry Marx : Georges de Porto-Riche, son œuvre, La Nouvelle Revue Critique, Paris, 1924
 Wolfgang Asholt: Gesellschaftskritisches Theater im Frankreich der Belle epoque (1887–1914) (Studia Romanica; 59). Verlag, Winter, Heidelberg 1984.  (zugl. Habilitationsschrift, Universität Münster 1983).
 Hermann Bahr: Glossen zum Wiener Thewater (1903–1906). S. Fischer, Berlin 1907.
 Hendrik Brugmans: Georges de Porto-Riche. Sa vie, son oeuvre. Droz, Paris 1934.
 Arthur Eloesser: Literarische Portraits aus dem modernen Frankreich. S. Fischer, Berlin 1904.
 W. Müller: Georges de Porto-Riche. Vrin Paris 1934.

References 

 Georges de PORTO-RICHE on the site of the Académie-Française.

1849 births
1930 deaths
Writers from Bordeaux
Members of the Académie Française
Grand Officiers of the Légion d'honneur
19th-century French poets
19th-century French dramatists and playwrights
20th-century French dramatists and playwrights